The Pulaski South Historic Residential and Industrial District encompasses an area of residential and industrial development on the south side of Pulaski, Virginia.  Located south of Commerce Street, the town's early commercial district, is an area that was developed between about 1880 and 1940 to support the growth of the Bertha Zinc and Mineral Company, a major local employer of the period whose industrial complex lies just west of the district.  The district includes tracts of modest worker housing, including brick rowhouses, and vernacular one and two-family frame houses.  There are two churches, one a fine brick Gothic church for a Pentecostal congregation, the other an Episcopal church since converted into housing.

The district was listed on the National Register of Historic Places in 1991.

See also
National Register of Historic Places listings in Pulaski County, Virginia

References

Historic districts on the National Register of Historic Places in Virginia
National Register of Historic Places in Pulaski County, Virginia
Gothic Revival architecture in Virginia
Queen Anne architecture in Virginia
Colonial Revival architecture in Virginia
Historic districts in Virginia